Elizabeth Lachlan (née Appleton; 1790 – 8 September 1849) was a British writer and education advocate. Born in Bristol, she moved with her family to London and spent some time in Europe, before returning to become a governess to aristocratic families including that of Lord Leven. In 1815, she wrote her first book on education, drawing on the ideas of Sarah Trimmer, building a strong reputation. Appleton went on to found a school for young ladies, was consulted in the education of Princess Charlotte and was possibly asked to act as governess for Princess Victoria.

Biography
Elizabeth Appleton was born in 1790, in Castle Street in Bristol. Her father had a strong affinity for the music and spent much of the family's fortune on furthering that interest. Believing his son, Appleton's eldest brother, to be a musical prodigy, he moved the family to London and found himself work at the Kidbrook Park estate. Appleton's brother died before realising his musical potential, and her father died soon after in 1802.

Appleton had a sporadic education, as a charity student in one school and then a day pupil in another. She eventually became interested in becoming a teacher. At the age of 14, she spent some time in France with her governess and in 1811, following an argument with her mother, she spent three years on the continent.

On her return to England, Appleton became a governess for highborn families including the 9th Earl of Leven. In 1815, she wrote her first book, Private Education, or, A Practical Plan for the Studies of Young Ladies: with an address to parents, private governesses, and young ladies, she dedicated the book to the Countess of Leven.

In 1825, Appleton married John Lachlan, a clergyman, buying him an advowson. Over the next few years, the Lachlans would suffer severe financial hardships, which started with the bankruptcy of her uncle. In 1832, John moved to Dunkirk to escape his debts, while Elizabeth attempted to re-establish her school. She became excessively evangelical, however, leading to a decline in her reputation. Elizabeth Lachlan died on 8 September 1849 of cholera.

Works on education
Appleton wrote about the education of young ladies and her views followed those of Sarah Trimmer's, that ladies should have a thorough education on subjects such as geography and astronomy. They should also have a clear understanding of morality and religion. Her books would give practical systems to help those who wanted to follow this style of education, with methodologies for different age groups and abilities, recommending reading texts to help. At the same time she advocated better pay and pensions for those women who entered the field of education.

In 1822, Appleton had set up a school for young ladies in Portland Place, London, and by 1825 she was earning £4,000 per year from it. Appleton had written a number of educational texts by this point, had been consulted on the education of Princess Charlotte and supposedly even asked to be governess for Princess Victoria.

Selected works

References

1790 births
1849 deaths
Writers from Bristol
Education activists
English governesses
19th-century English women writers